Kappur is a Village Panchayat in Villupuram District, in the Indian state of Tamil Nadu.  It serves as the headquarters of Kappur Panchayat which includes Nerkunam, Kuchipalyam, Govindapuram. The village's main source of income is agriculture. Its literacy rate was low until the early 1980s, but has since improved constantly and is currently above 60%. This village has many government offices such as post office and banks.

References 

Villages in Viluppuram district